Henri Baruk (August 15, 1897 in Saint-Avé, Morbihan – June 14, 1999 in Saint-Maurice, Val-de-Marne) was a French neuropsychiatrist of Jewish descent, internationally renowned, an apostle of Moral treatment, whose studies inspired by the Bible, and in contrast to Freud's, renewed positively the modern psychiatry. We talk about veritable resurrections concerning a number of his patients. (Memoires d'un Neuropsychiatre, Professeur Henri Baruk, ed. Pierre Tequi, Paris, 1990)

Biography
Baruk spent his childhood among patients at the Lesvellec's Asylum where his father, Jacques Baruk, was the chief doctor. Baruk served in World War I and was awarded the Croix de guerre.

References

External links
http://psychiatrie.histoire.free.fr/pers/bio/baruk.htm

1897 births
1999 deaths
French centenarians
Men centenarians
20th-century French Jews
French military personnel of World War I
French psychiatrists